Novoyadgarovskaya (Yañı Yäźgär) is a rural locality (a village) in Krivle-Ilyushkinsky Selsoviet, Kuyurgazinsky District, Bashkortostan, Russia. The population was 1 as of 2010. There is 1 street.

Geography 
Novoyadgarovskaya is located 26 km east of Yermolayevo (the district's administrative centre) by road. Znamenka is the nearest rural locality.

References 

Rural localities in Kuyurgazinsky District